Daily-Best Archive or Ilbe Storage, also known as Ilbe Garage, is a South Korean Internet forum that has a predominantly far-right userbase. The site was created in April 2010 and started as an archive of the "daily best" posts from DC Inside.

Ilbe's userbase is often described as having an alt-right, anti-feminist, anti-immigrant, and anti-LGBT stance. Due to its vocal users and strong political and cultural influence, Ilbe has gained widespread attention from social critics, with some labeling the website a social phenomenon. Some critics consider Ilbe a Korean analogue of 4chan and 2channel.

History 
Ilbe, short for Ilgan Best, is a term for sections on DC Inside showing the most popular threads of the day. Ilbe was among several archive websites that aggregated deleted threads. In November 2016, the sections were removed from DC Inside after the media started claiming that the Ilbe Archive was the original website while DC Inside branched off of it.

The old Ilbe was launched by Moe-myeongsu in July 2009 as an archive of the DC Inside TV comedies gallery. In 2016, he attempted to sue the new Ilbe owners, claiming they had mimicked his website while it was offline for maintenance.

In April 2010, another website with the same name was created by SAD from the LG Twins gallery. In November, he retired from running the site and left it to the users active at the time: Bucheo (부처) and Sae-bu (새부, from 새침부끄 Saechim-bukkeu). Bucheo would later also leave Ilbe due to military conscription, while Sae-bu would hire janitors, programmers, and other staff to run the site. A year later, Ilbe was reorganized as an independent forum.

In December 2012, Ilbe had over one million registered users. In April 2015, it reached over 2 million accounts. In September 2016, it had over 20,000 viewers at peak hours. Even in the mornings, when the number of viewers was minimal, the viewer count exceeded 10,000 people. According to the website administration, this data did not include mobile users, who made up 65% of total traffic.

In 2016, when the Park Geun-Hye scandal happened, the Ilbe audience reduced significantly, going from 700,000 daily viewers in September to 520,000 in December. Concurrent views at peak hours also decreased to 10,000 views.

In August 2018, a person nicknamed "Lazy Dawn" (나른한새벽 Nareun-han Saebyeok) became the administrator of the site.

Structure 
The website has very few rules, but it does prohibit users from mentioning each other by their username or getting too close to each other to prevent new users or dissenters from being down-voted indiscriminately by existing users. This policy promotes anonymity and equality. In contrast, on other popular Korean forums, older users are respected more and hold greater authority during discussions. These forums are largely unmoderated, with an exception for cases that may result in litigation or cases in response to complaints.

An account can be created with just an e-mail address; Ilbe doesn't require any documents or an ID number for registration, unlike other Korean websites. Users begin with a reputation of one, but can descend to zero as a result of downvoting by other users. Registration is required to post but not to view the boards (except for NSFW boards). An exception is a Random chat (잡담) board, which doesn't require an account—users are named "Anonym" with a random number. It was created for users who were tired of the Jjalbang obsession with politics, but it's not nearly as popular.

Jjalbang (짤방-유머 "Memes and Humor") is the most active board on Ilbe. Popular posts are featured on the "Daily Best" (일간베스트) boards, but may return to "Memes" if they receive too many dislikes. "Like" and "dislike" buttons on Ilbe are named "to the daily best!" (일베로 ilbe-ro) and "democratization" (民主化 민주화 minjuhwa). Only registered users can vote. Users with a high reputation can vote twice.

The Politics board was created to separate serious political posts from general forums, but it later became a distinct community, often antagonizing the Jjalbang board, which often features political memes. Politics favors Park Geun-hye, while in Jjalbang, Lee Myung-bak is preferred. In 2020, the core "oldfag" users migrated to DC Inside, initially to the "Wuhan Minor" gallery, and then to the "US Politics Minor" gallery.

The Animation board is often described as the center of Ilbe. Its main topic is Japanese anime, but other topics are discussed, and the board is often compared to the Random board. Users on anime board tend to socialize more than other users; they gather in KakaoTalk chats to talk and play games, even though the moderators try to prevent it. The board antagonizes the Girl groups and artists (걸그룹/연예인) board, not only because it is considered a "3D reservation", but also due to the gap between Japanese and Korean pop culture.

Subculture 
A large part of Ilbe's subculture comes from the users' collective identity as "losers": until the founding of Ilbe, most of the large Korean forums were left-leaning and hostile to moderate right-wing opinions. Thus, Ilbe's userbase has embraced many of the derogatory terms used to refer to them, such as "Ilgay" (일게이).

Ilbe inherited a large part of its subculture from DC Inside. Many controversial memes originate from DC Inside, including Roh Moo-hyun memes from DC Inside Happhil gallery, as well as hong'eo (a slur targeting Jeolla people) and eomuk (어묵, derogatory term used to refer to Sewol ferry disaster victims) from the Basketball gallery.

Ilbe users are known for redacting well-known logos of organisations like universities, government structures, large private companies, as well as movie posters, and then adding tiny hints consisting of Ilbe initials, Ro Mu-hyeon's face, and other memes. Occasionally the media pick up such images and use them in reports. Evidence of such uses is recorded on Ilbe in a distinct genre of posts called "Broadcast proofs" (방송 인증).

Another type of popular post is Dongmuljup (동물줍). It features Ilbe users picking up street animals, usually birds and cats, but sometimes strange and exotic animals. The ironic term Saramjup (사람줍) describes reporting drunk people who have fainted on the streets to the police. The users who do that are termed Haeng-gays (행게이, short for 행동하는 회원 "an active member").

"Sniper posts" (저격글) are also common on the site. They discuss posts from Ilbe or other websites to analyze them or expose their flaws. They often feature investigations of posted photos and find clues to determine where and how they were taken.

Political stance

Background 
Ilbe's users' political stance is generally to the right, which has generated controversy, mainly from those who are politically left-aligned. Users of the site often express racism towards Chinese and East Asian people, but European, American, and Japanese people are viewed positively.

Prior to the 2008 US beef protest in South Korea, opinions of right-wing supporters were mostly disregarded or criticized, because most South Korean websites were dominated by left-wing websites and internet users. Out of 12 major community websites in South Korea, only Ilbe and DC inside possess a "right-wing" political disposition. After the protest, many right-wing internet users started to express their opinions on the internet. DC inside and Ilbe grew quickly as myriads of new right-wing users registered.

As Ilbe was the first major online community in South Korea with a distinctively right-wing tone, it has been noted as a haven for the right-wing on the internet. Ilbe's ideology is sometimes described as factism by its proponents, treated as a countermeasure against alleged left-wing propaganda, specifically false information about the right.

Criticism of Korean leaders 
The Ilbe community is mainly known by Koreans for allegedly making fun of former president Roh Moo-hyun. The political parties have criticized Roh Mu-Hyeon and other political leaders through many forms of media, such as comedy, parody music, and spreading rumors on social media. Users make an Ilbe "theme song" every year, and they regularly parody popular songs with lyrics that criticize leaders. Ilbe users compose their parody songs as propaganda to attract people to join the community. The songs contain exaggerated expressions of political leaders and colloquially refer to them as "MC Muhyeon" (Roh Moo-hyun), "DJ Daejung" (Kim Dae-jung), "MC Jong-Un" (Kim Jong-un), and "MC Geunhye" (Park Geun-hye). Ilbe users also call May 23 "The day of Gravity", making fun of Roh Moo-Hyun's death by claiming that gravity killed him. One of their notable memes is the "Noala", an image of Roh Mu-Hyeon with a photoshopped koala face. Ilbe also created the label Unji (隕地 운지, composed of hanja characters meaning "to fall" and "ground", also referencing the Unjicheon beverage promotion clips). A distinct part of the Ilbe slang is the ~노 verb ending, referencing Roh Moo-hyun's surname.

On January 25, 2018, a poster showing Roh Mu-Hyeon making the Ilbe hand sign appeared in Times Square, New York. Ilbe users claimed to have posted the advertisement to commemorate the birthday of then-president Moon Jae-in. The advertisement also featured Noala and Unji memes.

On November 7, 2013, former first lady Lee Hee-ho, whose husband was former president Kim Dae-jung, accused some Ilbe users of degrading deceased president Kim by spreading false information.

Presidents with popular support on Ilbe are called gakha (가카, corrupted from 閣下 각하 "Their Excellency", an obsolete title associated with dictatorship). It was initially used to refer to Lee Myung-bak, who purportedly planned to restore the title, and then it was used for Park Chung-hee (元祖閣下 원조가카 weonjo gakha "original gakha") and his daughter Park Geun-hye (레카 rekha, short for 레이디 가카 reidi gakha "Lady gakha"). The term 갓카 (with 갓, the Korean transliteration of the English word God) is also used to imply the president possesses omnipotence.

Denial of Gwangju Uprising 
Despite the South Korean government's official recognition of the Gwangju Uprising as a democratic movement, Ilbe is extremely critical of it.

The May 18 Memorial Foundation, one of the Gwangju Uprising memorial organizations, announced that Ilbe was spreading conspiracy theories such as:
North Korean special forces were involved in the Gwangju Uprising.
The Gwangju Uprising was a heavily armed riot.
Military suppression against citizens was justifiable.
The 5.18 Special Law (5.18특별법), which pays respect to the Gwangju Uprising, is unconstitutional.

Ilbe labels some journalists, like former chief editor of Monthly Chosun Cho Gap-je, as jwappal (좌빨 "Far-left communist") due to their support of the Gwangju Uprising.

Hatred towards the Honam region 
Almost all of Ilbe users have an intense dislike for the Honam region, historically known as Jeolla, in the southwestern portion of South Korea. Reasons cited include the fact that Honam had a 98% vote for a regional left-wing party candidate Kim Dae-jung, and the belief that the Gwangju Uprising has been placed on a pedestal by those living there, to the extent that all other moments in the history of Korean democratization are overlooked, and the belief that it was a riot instead of a democratization uprising or movement. The intense dislike manifests as verbal attacks against Jeolla and related political figures.

Misogyny 
Ilbe takes an extremely hostile attitude toward types of South Korean women that it deems undesirable, and expresses hatred towards them. Ilbe members think that men are superior and that women should be deferential to them. Ilbe labels women who do not conform to such gender norms with the derogatory term "Kimchi Nyun", which is a reference to their national food, kimchi.

Ilbe's community is anti-feminist, and is mostly composed of men. Female users of Ilbe are called "Am-Be-Choong" (암베충; "Am": expression for females (mostly used for animals), "Be": (ilbe), "Choong": insect) by other users. Female users who openly "come out" as women are banned from the website due to concerns their presence will cause disputes.

Criticism 
Shin Hye-sik, representative of the right-wing Dokrip Newspaper said that "[Ilbe users] should apologize for their problematic claims". Kim Young-hwan, a former pro-North activist, said, "Right-wing is an attitude to inherit conservative awareness, but in this criteria Ilbe is not right-wing. Ilbe's radical argument will escalate social chaos". Yoon Pyong-joong, professor of Hanshin University, defined Ilbe's far-right extremism as "not worth discussing at all". They all believed Ilbe should be criticized by public argument instead of by legal action. Conservative magazine Shindonga released a special section to criticize Ilbe, describing it as "close to fascism rather than normal right-wing" and "antisocial". Japanese journalist Yasuda Goichi, the author of The Internet and Patriotism (Netto to Aikoku), viewed Ilbe as similar to Uyoku dantai, a Japanese anti-Zainichi far-right online community.

One sexual assault counsellor said, "It is the combination of [the] commodification of women and peer culture which lies beneath Korean society", and women's organization Women link activist Lee Yoon-so said, "Ilbe seems to express misogyny behind anonymity, and enjoying its propagation". Misogyny is expressed as Ilbe's language subculture. Misogynistic Ilbe users simultaneously bemoan the fact that men have to serve in the military and that most breadwinners in South Korean families are men, while opposing women in the workplace.

The lack of moderation sometimes results in illegal and harmful behavior, including defamation and harassment. The actions of the website users are routinely disapproved of by Korean officials. A notable case was when the Korea Communications Standards Commission (KCSC) requested Ilbe to regulate its problematic content that was "harmful for teenagers". On the other hand, the website has been praised for its anonymity and open expression of right-wing opinions: Ahn Hyung-Hwan, a spokesman for the right-wing Saenuri Party mentioned Ilbe as a "free space where innocent people can speak their minds freely". In a parliamentary inspection held in October 2013, a member of the Democratic Party, Yu Seung-hui, described Ilbe as "antisocial". He released information from the KCSC, including hundreds of submitted complaints about harmful content on Ilbe promoting suicide, crime, drug usage, sexism, and violence, as well as defamation and discrimination against left-wing politics and the Jeolla region.

As some of the users engage in harmful behavior both online and offline, the website has acquired a generally negative image. Thus, users tend to not reveal they are an Ilbe user (referred to as "Ilming-out") in the real world to avoid ostracization. Ilbe users devised a hand sign that represents the Korean initials of the website's name to discretely indicate they use Ilbe.

At times, Korean celebrities have accidentally used Ilbe terminology on social media, leading people to think they are Ilbe members. To avoid being misunderstood as an Ilbe member, artists and companies add cautions to their products and publicly deny their affiliation. For example, the agency of K-pop dance group Crayon Pop mentioned Ilbe as "antisocial" while denying alleged involvement with Ilbe. Despite that, Crayon Pop artists became icons on Ilbe, and its users started massively purchasing their albums. Korean professional gamer Hong Jin-ho denied his alleged involvement with Ilbe, writing "I have never visited Ilbe. I heard about Ilbe and it is disagreeable. Such allegations are disgusting." on his Twitter account. Conservative Saenuri Party member Kim Jin-tae raised controversy when he accessed Ilbe with his laptop during a parliamentary inspection at National Assembly.

Controversies 
Ilbe users have organized mass protests that included singing Ilbe songs in city squares, and as a result, many Ilbe users were tried for degrading the public order. On November 28, 2013, the first trial was conducted for defamation committed by an Ilbe user who injured the honor of Gwangju Uprising victims by disparaging a photo of their corpse as "Skate parcel". The offender claimed that he felt sorry for his actions and he sent an apology to the victims by phone call, but the organizations related to Gwangju Uprising victims said there was no such apology. He requested the jurisdictional transfer of his case from Gwangju District Court to Daegu District Court and it was accepted.

The website also raised controversy for mocking the death of boy-band singer Lim Yoon-taek.

In April 2013, after Anonymous Korea released the membership list of Uriminzokkiri, Ilbe users "witchhunted" many identities from the list as "communist" and "North Korean spies".

After the Seoul National University Student Council's declaration of protest against the 2013 South Korea Election Meddling Scandal, an Ilbe user released photos of some members and stated, "I don't care whether you guys lynch them or not". Seoul National University Student Council stated that they were considering a lawsuit against Ilbe.

On September 30, 2013, a 32-year-old male Ilbe user protested in front of Ewha Womans University. He hung a cardboard sign around his neck with derogatory messages written about Ewha University students, comfort women, other Korean women. Some comments related to women's genitalia while others stated that such women were "communist" and "pro-North Korea". He was fined  by the Seoul West Prosecutor's Office, but he blamed this on "wrong democracy".

On November 7, 2013, former first lady Lee Hee-ho, whose husband was former president Kim Dae-jung, accused some Ilbe users of degrading deceased president Kim by spreading false information.

On 10 December 2013, an Ilbe user claiming to be an employee of the Comotomo feeding bottle company alleged that he interrupted the manufacturing process by "sucking on" feeding bottles. He confirmed his employment at the company by uploading his photo on Ilbe under the title "Titty Party" and commented, "Sometimes I suck this feeding bottle when I miss female breasts so much". His post raised outrage in the childcare community, for his vulgarism and hygiene concerns. Comotomo Korea released an official apology for the controversy and mentioned their employment of the individual was a mistake. The employee's accident report was revealed, in which he confessed: "I submitted vulgar contents on Ilbe. I caused economic and mental damage to the company and consumers for my own entertainment. The feeding bottle controversy that I created is totally false and I will take any legal responsibility."

Seoul Central District Court accepted a provisional injunction against Ilbe. It was petitioned by an Ilbe critic who was degraded and threatened by Ilbe users. As a result, Ilbe was forced to delete some offending contents.

Some police officers and soldiers publicly described former presidents Chun Doo-hwan and Park Chung-hee as "patriotic" on Ilbe, which caused controversy because they violated the political neutrality required for public officers. In another instance, a police officer described left-wing protesters as "rioters" on Ilbe. He was sent to the Yongsan police office disciplinary committee.

Some Ilbe members allegedly registered in SHINee world (fan club) to post defamatory comments about Jonghyun after he voiced his support for a student cause in support of gay rights. Moreover, they posted obscene photos with offensive captions related to women's bodies on the fan site.

In August 2017, Gi Maeng-gi, author of the Naver webtoon My ID is Gangnam Beauty, filed a complaint for misdemeanor against an Ilbe member for making malicious posts about her and her feminist views on the site. The offending individual later posted a copy of the complaint on Ilbe under the title "I was sued by a webtoon writer", and he accused the prosecutor of "being biased".

Posters vandalism 
In December 2013, some Ilbe users vandalized hand-written posters in universities and colleges around South Korea which criticized political indifference, social disharmony, inequality, South Korea spy allegations, an ongoing rail strike, and other political and social issues. The posters originated from Korea University and spread among some Korean universities. The posters were seen as far-left, communistic, and pro-North Korea by the Ilbe users involved.

The posters on the Korea University campus were vandalized by Ilbe users. A user confirmed his participation in the vandalism by uploading his photo online with sexually degrading comments against the original writer of the poster. After it became controversial, he revealed his identity and uploaded an apology for his actions, but also announced that he would accuse people who degraded him and his actions.

Similar vandalism is ongoing nationwide such as at Busan University, Hannam University in Daejeon, and Sogang University.

Ha Tae-keung, a member of the conservative Saenuri Party (now People Power Party) described Ilbe users who committed such vandalism as "losers".

Hacking cases 
In 2012, some anonymous Ilbe users attempted an XSS attack against TodayHumor, a website with a left-wing stance. The administrator of TodayHumor announced that he would consider legal action against Ilbe.

An unknown hacker group made a distributed denial-of-service attack on Ilbe on April 7, 2013. The attack was reported as possible revenge of Anonymous for Ilbe's vandalism in the #OpIsrael IRC. Anonymous Korea claimed on its Twitter account that it was not involved with the denial of service at Ilbe, but also mentioned that Ilbe members entered the chatroom used by Anonymous hackers, used insulting language, and spammed the chatroom. The relationship between Anonymous Korea and Anonymous remains ambiguous.

Sewol ferry victims defamation 
In September 2014, when the parents of the victims of Sewol ferry disaster protested with public hunger strikes, over 100 Ilbe users went on "binge eating" events in front of them. It was the first offline event Ilbe users took part in.

In January 2015, an Ilbe user posted a photo of himself in Danwon High School uniform eating eomuk fish cakes. He demonstrated the Ilbe hand sign and titled the post "I have eaten my friend!" (implying the fish which ate the corpses of Sewol victims is now in this eomuk). The post was disseminated on social media, and the victims of Sewol were labelled eomuks and odengthang (eomuk soup). The police arrested a 21-year-old person surnamed Kim. His mother publicly apologized. The words eomuk and odengthang got banned on Ilbe.

Harassment cases 
Ilbe users have posted pornographic images of female children in middle school and high school, including their family members, to the website.

A pre-service elementary teacher depicted female elementary school students as lolini (로린이, "Lolita girl") and wrote associated sexual content on Ilbe. This caused controversy and ended with him resigning.

On November 22, 2013, a student of Kangwon Provincial College, a self-proclaimed Ilbe user, sexually harassed a female Buddhist monk on Twitter with comments about her virginity. Three days later, the monk Hyo-jeon asked for follow-up action from the president of the college, but the Ilbe user didn't apologize and continued to insult her. Following the controversy, he deleted his Twitter account and the president of the college gave an official apology.

In October 2018, an Ilbe user uploaded a photo of a naked old woman in a post titled "32-years old Ilgay saved his pocket money and ate 74-years BACCHUS grandma"(32살 일게이 용돈 아껴서 74살 바카스 할매 먹고 왓다). This post contained a story of a visit to a prostitute. It was revealed that the story was fictitious. The first person to post this picture online was a 46-year-old Seocho District Office's employee.

In November 2018, an Ilbe user uploaded erotic photos of a girl in a post titled "Girlfriend proof" (女親認證 여친인증 yeochin injeung). A series of similar posts followed it. The police investigated and identified 15 posters, 13 of which were arrested. Six of them confessed to posting their real girlfriends, while the rest posted images found in the Internet.

See also 
 Conservatism in South Korea
 Minjuhwa
 Angry young man (South Korea)

References 

South Korean political websites
Internet properties established in 2010
Internet forums
Alt-right in Asia
Alt-right websites
Conservatism in South Korea
Cybercrime
Far-right politics in South Korea
Racism in South Korea
Right-wing populism in South Korea
Opposition to feminism in South Korea
Sexism in South Korea
Websites with far-right material